Jamie Paterson may refer to:

Jamie Paterson (footballer, born 1973), Scottish footballer
Jamie Paterson (footballer, born 1991), English footballer

See also
Jamie Patterson (disambiguation)
James Paterson (disambiguation)